Dezider Hoffmann (1912 – 1986), also known as Dezo Hoffmann or Dežo Hoffmann,  was a Slovak photographer, photojournalist and cameraman from Czechoslovakia. In the 1960s he photographed pop and showbiz personalities, including the Beatles.

Biography
Hoffmann was born on 24 May 1912 in Banská Štiavnica, Austria-Hungary, now Slovakia. After studying journalism in Prague, he worked at Twentieth Century Fox in Paris as a photojournalist. During Mussolini's invasion of Abyssinia he was sent to make a documentary of the invasion. After returning from Africa he was sent to Spain to film the 1936 People's Olympiad (a protest against the official Olympic games in Berlin under Hitler's propaganda). Soon after he arrived in Spain, the civil war broke out and Dezo found himself on the barricades. In this period he met personalities such as Hemingway and Robert Capa.

Dezo was injured a few times in war. The third injury was serious, leaving him without memory for several months. After recovery he moved to England and joined the squadron of Czechoslovak pilots flying with the RAF during World War II.

After the war he remained in London, working for various newspapers and magazines. In 1955 he began his collaboration with Record Mirror magazine, which was the start of his career photographing show-business celebrities.

In 1962 he went to Liverpool to photograph an unknown group—the Beatles. Mutual appreciation and sympathy led to a long-lasting relationship between Hoffmann and the group. Dezo also made an 8 mm colour film during this first Beatles assignment, also featuring scenes shot by the Beatles. His photo collection of the Beatles has been shown in the Egri Road Beatles Múzeum in Hungary since 2015.

Most of the photos used in the Beatles' Live at the BBC CD/LP, including the front cover photo, were taken by Dezo.

Besides the Beatles, Dezo was photographing many other famous people like Charlie Chaplin, Marilyn Monroe, Marlon Brando, Elton John, Bob Marley, Cliff Richard, Sophia Loren, Frank Sinatra, Louis Armstrong, Jimi Hendrix, as well as music bands like the Animals and the Rolling Stones.

In 1982, Omnibus Press published With the Beatles - The historic photographs of Dezo Hoffmann, with photographs by Dezo during the prime of Beatlemania. Hoffmann sold 100 of his Beatles negatives to Australian Colin Kaye. The remainder of Dezo's archive of approximately 1 million photographs of pop musicians and showbiz personalities was acquired by Rex Features.

Hoffmann died on 29 March 1986, aged 73, in the Harley Street Clinic, London. He was cremated at Golders Green Crematorium.

Publications
With the Beatles - The historic photographs of Dezo Hoffmann. Omnibus, 1982. .

Collections
Hoffmann's work is held in the following permanent collection:
National Portrait Gallery, London

Further reading
Fotograf Beatles: Dezo Hoffmann, biography by Marián Pauer

References

External links

Slovak journalists
1910s births
1986 deaths
Czechoslovak emigrants to the United Kingdom
Slovak photographers
Hungarian photographers
20th-century journalists